Air Marshal Carey William Adamson,  (5 September 1942 – 10 May 2019) was a senior officer of the Royal New Zealand Air Force.

Adamson grew up in Fairlie before attending Timaru Boys' High School, where he was a boarder apart from his final year, when he commuted daily on his motorcycle. As a teenager, Adamson joined the Air Training Corps. He then joined the Royal New Zealand Air Force in 1961, where he served as a pilot flying Austers and Harvards. In 1964 Adamson was assigned to the United States to train on the C130 Hercules.

He was Chief of the Air Staff from 1995 to 1999 and Chief of Defence Force from 1999 to 2001. In 2002, he caused "unprecedented controversy" when he criticised the government for disestablishing the air combat force.

In the 1979 Queen's Birthday Honours, Adamson was awarded the Air Force Cross. In the 1999 New Year Honours, he was appointed a Companion of the New Zealand Order of Merit.

Adamson was predeceased by his wife, Denyce (née Pickens), in 2013. He had Parkinson's disease for the last few years of his life, and died on 10 May 2019. He received a military funeral at Wellington Cathedral of St Paul.

References

External links
South Canterbury Museum Collections – Air Vice Marshal Carey Adamson

|-

1942 births
2019 deaths
Companions of the New Zealand Order of Merit
New Zealand military personnel of the Vietnam War
People educated at Timaru Boys' High School
People from Fairlie, New Zealand
New Zealand recipients of the Air Force Cross (United Kingdom)
Royal New Zealand Air Force air marshals